Two Crown King was a London, Ontario, Canada based alternative rock and alternative hip hop band.

History

Formation and Is A Demo
The band was originally formed in the summer of 2009 by Adam Dick and Sean Goodchild who met while studying at Fanshawe College. They immediately went to work on a four-song demo, Is A Demo, with producer and friend, Dan Weston. The demo was released independently in June, 2009. A single, A One Man Mess, was released on iTunes on June 11, 2009.

By September, 2009 the band had grown to six full-time members. Joining Dick and Goodchild were Pat Maloney on drums, Ajay Massey on guitar, Jeremy Pimentel on bass and John Yun on keys. On Friday, September 25, 2009 they played their first ever live show, as direct support for Canadian alternative rock act, USS.

Is A Demo was later released in full on iTunes on September 1, 2010.

Two Crown King (EP) and lineup change
In December, 2010 the band recorded a six track, self-titled EP at Jukasa Studios with Vancouver based producer, Ben Kaplan. Kaplan's previous credits include Hedley, Rise Against and Gallows.

Immediately following the recording of the album John Yun was permanently replaced by Scotty Parker, former keyboardist of Machete Avenue.

A single, We Get Down was released on iTunes on March 1, 2011. Two Crown King (EP) was released on iTunes on July 1, 2011. The artwork for the album was illustrated by Jacqui Oakley and has received global acclaim for its package design.

Ben's Song
On February 4, 2012, the band released Ben's Song on iTunes in partnership with Skate4Cancer. The song was written for a close friend of the band whose mother had died from cancer. All sales from Ben's Song are donated to Princess Margaret Hospital.

On February 16, 2012, Ben's Song was inducted into FM96's Hall Of Fame after winning the Battle of the New Rock ten consecutive times.

Second lineup change
Drummer, Pat Maloney, played his last show with the band on September 13, 2012 at Western Fair in London, Ontario. He was replaced by "Jimi" James Tanney. At this time, Drew "DJ DoubleDown" Hopeson also joined the band, increasing the total of full-time members to seven.

1604 (EP)
The band's second EP, 1604, was released on April 2, 2013 and debuted at #61 on the Canadian iTunes Chart.

Discography 
 Is A Demo – 2009
 Two Crown King (EP) – 2011
 Ben's Song (single) – 2012
 1604 (EP) - 2013

Band members

Current members
Adam Dick – Lead vocals
Sean Goodchild – Lead vocals
Drew "DJ DoubleDown" Hopeson – DJ
Ajay Massey – Guitar/Backing vocals
Scotty Parker – Keys/Backing vocals
Jeremy Pimentel – Bass
 "Jimi" James Tanney – Drums

Past members
John Yun – Keys
Pat Maloney – Drums

References

External links
 Two Crown King Official website

Musical groups established in 2009
Musical groups from London, Ontario
Canadian alternative rock groups
2009 establishments in Ontario